The 1 GAME: Football without violence campaign was founded in June 2010, by Nigerian TV Presenter Philip Obaji. The initiative seeks to promote peaceful co-existence among supporters involved in football followership. It draws support from past and present footballers, football administrators, and celebrities, mostly from Nigeria.

It campaigns to put an end to violence and fanaticism in football, using its website to call on football enthusiasts to rise up in support of its call for an end to fanaticism and vices in the game.

As of May 2011, more than one hundred thousand people have signed up to be part of the campaign, a campaign that was widely lauded by Livescore.press, including Jamaica's Reggae Musician Shaggy, Hip-hop duo P-Square, former England striker John Fashanu; former Nigeria National football team players Christian Chukwu, Mutiu Adepoju, Henry Nwosu, Efe Sodje and Jonathan Akpoborie; Nigeria Football Federation (NFF) President Aminu Maigari and some members of NFF Executive Committee.

References 

 Free Livescore Praises 1 Game Anti-violence Efforts
 Adepoju joins anti violence campaign
 Sodje joins anti violence campaign
 Akpoborie backs anti violence campaign
 Taiwo Ogunjobi teams up with 1 GAME
 Ekigho Ehiosun Wants Football Without Violence
 
 Nwosu campaigns against violence
 John Fashanu joins campaign against football violence

External links
 1 GAME on Facebook
 Follow 1 GAME on Twitter

Sports organizations of Nigeria
Association football hooliganism